Radzionków is a town in Silesia in southern Poland, near Katowice. Borders on the Upper Silesian Metropolitan Union – metropolis with the population of 2 million. Located in the Silesian Highlands.

It is situated in the Silesian Voivodeship since its formation in 1999, previously in Katowice Voivodeship, and before then, of the Autonomous Silesian Voivodeship. In 1975–1997 it was a part of Bytom before it became a separate entity in 1998. Radzionków is one of the towns of the 2.7 million conurbation – Katowice urban area and within a greater Silesian metropolitan area populated by about 5,294,000 people. The population of the town is 16,826 (2019).

See also
Ruch Radzionków – football club from Radzionków

References

External links
Official webpage
RTSK Radzionków

 
Cities and towns in Silesian Voivodeship
Tarnowskie Góry County
Silesian Voivodeship (1920–1939)